Conic optimization is a subfield of convex optimization that studies problems consisting of minimizing a convex function over the intersection of an affine subspace and a convex cone.

The class of conic optimization problems includes some of the most well known classes of convex optimization problems, namely linear and semidefinite programming.

Definition

Given a real vector space X, a convex, real-valued function

Examples of  include the positive orthant , positive semidefinite matrices , and the second-order cone .  Often  is a linear function, in which case the conic optimization problem reduces to a linear program, a semidefinite program, and a second order cone program, respectively.

Duality
Certain special cases of conic optimization problems have notable closed-form expressions of their dual problems.

Conic LP
The dual of the conic linear program

minimize 
subject to 

is

maximize 
subject to 

Whilst weak duality holds in conic linear programming, strong duality does not necessarily hold.

Semidefinite Program
The dual of a semidefinite program in inequality form

 minimize  
 subject to 

is given by

 maximize  
 subject to

References

External links
 
 MOSEK Software capable of solving conic optimization problems.

Convex optimization